Viennese cuisine is the cuisine that is characteristic of Vienna, Austria, and a majority of its residents.  Viennese cuisine is often treated as equivalent to Austrian cuisine, but while elements of Viennese cuisine have spread throughout Austria, other Austrian regions have their own unique variations.

Viennese cuisine is best known for its Wiener schnitzel and pastries, but it includes a wide range of other unique dishes.

Vienna has been the capital of Austria for more than a thousand years. It became the cultural centre of the nation and developed its own regional cuisine; as such, Viennese cuisine has distinct cooking.

The variety of ingredients sold on the Naschmarkt might lead to the thought of a broadly varied cooking culture. In fact, dishes heavily depending on meat make up typical Viennese cuisine: Wiener schnitzel (veal coated in breadcrumbs and fried), Tafelspitz (boiled beef), Beuschel (a ragout containing veal lungs and heart), and Selchfleisch (smoked meat) with sauerkraut and dumplings are typical of its cooking. Some sweet Viennese dishes include Apfelstrudel (strudel pastry filled with apples), Millirahmstrudel (milk-cream strudel), Kaiserschmarrn (shredded pancakes served with fruit compotes), and Sachertorte (cake of two layers of chocolate cake with apricot jam in the middle). These and many other desserts will be on offer at one of the many Konditorei of Vienna, where they are generally eaten with coffee in the afternoon. Liptauer as a spread, or Powidl also as spread or base for dumplings are also quite popular.

History
The Viennese cooking tradition developed from many different sources: "Viennese cuisine is all about—an eclectic mix of cuisines from Europe and beyond, of all regions and lands that were once part of the monarchy."

Italian influence has been strong since roughly the early 17th Century. In the 18th Century, French cuisine became influential in Vienna, along with French etiquette and diplomatic language. The term "Wiener Küche" (Viennese cuisine) first appeared in German language cookbooks around the end of the 18th century, and it was mistakenly treated as equivalent to Austrian cuisine.

The croissant is also thought to have originated in Vienna after the defeat of the Turks in the Siege of Vienna.

In the second half of the 19th century, cookbooks started to include Bohemian, Hungarian, Italian, Jewish, Polish, and Balkan features in Viennese cuisine. Viennese cooking reflected foods brought in from various parts of the Austro-Hungarian Empire: "Viennese menus usually comprise the same group of dishes, sometimes Austrian in origin but often inherited from the various nationalities of the empire: Hungarian goulash ... wiener schnitzel ... south Slav ćevapčići... crêpe-like Palatschinken (claimed by the Romanians), and Powidltascherl ... from the Czechs, to name but a few."

Modern Viennese cuisine
In modern Vienna, many chefs have begun to combine traditional Viennese dishes with the principles of nouvelle cuisine to create what is known as "Neue Wiener Küche" (New Viennese cuisine). This includes vegetarian food.

Also, Turkish, Jewish, Middle Eastern, and Indian cuisine have influence on the city because of growing immigrant communities.

Coffee houses 

The Viennese coffee house is such an important part of the cuisine and culture of Vienna, that the concept is listed as "Intangible Cultural Heritage" in the Austrian inventory of the "National Agency for the Intangible Cultural Heritage", a part of UNESCO. The Viennese coffee house is described in this inventory as a place, "where time and space are consumed, but only the coffee is found on the bill."

Viennese dishes 

Typical Viennese dishes include:

 Apfelstrudel (an apple-filled pastry)
 Topfenstrudel (a quark cheese-filled strudel)
 Palatschinken (Viennese crêpes)
 Kaiserschmarrn (caramelized and shredded pancake)
 Buchteln (from Czech buchty): sweet rolls made of yeast dough, filled, traditionally, with Powidl, (or, in some modern variants, with apricot jam) and butter-baked.
 Germknödel
 Marillenknödel
 Powidl (from Czech povidla)
 Sachertorte (a chocolate cake)
 Wiener schnitzel
 Tafelspitz (boiled beef, often served with apple and horseradish sauces)
 Gulasch (a hotpot similar to Hungarian pörkölt, gulyás is stew with more sauce or soup in Hungary)
 Selchfleisch (smoked meat) with Sauerkraut and dumplings.
 Rindsuppe (beef soup)
 Beuschel (a ragout containing veal lungs and heart)
 Liptauer cheese

See also
Vienna bread, the unique and influential style of lighter bread with fresh leavening that developed in Vienna
 Viennoiserie, a French term referring to baked goods in the style of or influenced by Viennese baking

References

Austrian cuisine
Cuisine